Bloo is the debut extended play by American model, singer and songwriter Kacy Hill. It was released through GOOD Music, Def Jam Recordings and PMR Recordings on 9 October 2015.

Background
In 2014, Hill signed with GOOD Music, a record label run by Kanye West, and later with Def Jam Recordings. Her debut single, "Experience", was released on 14 September 2014.

In 2015, Hill announced that she was working on writing and producing new music, specifically a song called "Foreign Fields". Early in the second half of 2015, she revealed the details of her debut EP, Bloo, with "Foreign Fields" being the lead single. The single was released on 16 September 2015, and the EP was released on 9 October 2015.

In early 2016, Hill embarked on a tour as a guest act alongside Jack Garratt, who co-produced Bloo.

Track listing

Notes
  indicates an additional producer
  indicates a re-mixer

References

GOOD Music EPs
Def Jam Recordings EPs
2015 debut EPs